Fred J. Lincoln (January 19, 1936 – January 17, 2013) was an American director, producer, screenwriter, actor, editor, and cinematographer of pornographic films.

Biography 
Born Fred Piantadosi, Lincoln grew up in the Hell's Kitchen neighborhood of New York City. His career in adult film and video was prolific; his filmography at the Internet Movie Database credits him as the director of 310 films, the producer of 42, and as an actor in 64 films. In 1984, Lincoln won the Critics' Adult Film Award as Best Director for his film Go for It.

His credits in mainstream cinema are limited, although he did play the role of Weasel Podowski in Wes Craven's 1972 horror film The Last House on the Left. He starred alongside David Hess, Sandra Peabody, Jeramie Rain, Marc Sheffler and Lucy Grantham He contributed to its DVD commentary track with costars Hess and Sheffler. In 1973, he starred in Sean S. Cunningham's horror film Case of the Full Moon Murders with his Last House costar Sandra Peabody.

Lincoln was a member of the AVN Hall of Fame, and the XRCO Hall of Fame.

Lincoln succeeded Larry Levinson as the owner of the 1970s and 1980s New York City sex club Plato's Retreat.

Lincoln was married several times, most notably to pornographic director Patti Rhodes-Lincoln and former pornographic actress Tiffany Clark.

At one point, Lincoln lived in Ventura, California in an apartment adjacent to pornographic actress Erica Boyer.

Death
Lincoln died on January 17, 2013, at his home in Los Angeles from complications of emphysema and heart disease at age 76. He is survived by his daughter Angelica and his son, Charles.

Partial filmography

Further reading 
 Fred J. Lincoln,  Oral History Interviews, Leather Archives & Museum

References

External links 

 
 

American pornographic film directors
American pornographic film producers
Film producers from California
1936 births
2013 deaths
American cinematographers
American film editors
American male film actors
American male pornographic film actors
American male screenwriters
American pornographers
Directors of lesbian pornographic films
Film directors from New York City
Film directors from Los Angeles
20th-century American male actors
21st-century American male actors
Screenwriters from New York (state)
Film producers from New York (state)
Screenwriters from California